Gyrogra is a genus of skippers in the family Hesperiidae. It contains only one species, Gyrogra subnotata, the odd leaf sitter, which is found in Guinea, Sierra Leone, Ivory Coast, Ghana, Nigeria, Cameroon, Gabon, the Republic of the Congo and the Democratic Republic of the Congo. The habitat consists of forests.

References
Natural History Museum Lepidoptera genus database

References

 Seitz, A. Die Gross-Schmetterlinge der Erde 13: Die Afrikanischen Tagfalter. Plate XIII 79

Erionotini
Monotypic butterfly genera
Hesperiidae genera